Callum Jason Noel Camps (born 30 November 1995) is a professional footballer who plays as a midfielder for Stockport County. Born in England, he has represented Northern Ireland internationally at youth levels.

Club career

Rochdale
Camps came through the Rochdale youth team to make his senior debut on 13 April 2013, replacing Ashley Grimes 68 minutes into a 2–2 draw with Port Vale at Spotland. In September 2013, Camps signed his first professional contract, keeping him until 2016. At the end of the 2013–14 season, Camps was awarded Maureen Peacock Youth Player of the Year.

Camps made his full debut on 3 January 2015, in a 1–0 win over Nottingham Forest in the FA Cup. Weeks later on 31 January 2015, Camps scored his first Rochdale goal, in a 2–2 draw against Coventry City. His goal against Coventry City also earned him a nomination for Goal of the Season.

On 23 October 2015, Camps signed a one-year extension to his current contract with Rochdale having a one-year option to extend his contract.

On 28 June 2017, Camps signed another contract extension, keeping him at the club until the summer of 2020.

Fleetwood Town
On 1 August 2020, Camps signed a two-year contract at Fleetwood Town. He scored on his debut for the club in an EFL Trophy tie against Carlisle United.

On 5 May 2022, Camps was announced to be leaving the club upon the expiration of his contract.

Stockport County
On 4 July 2022, Camps joined newly promoted League Two club Stockport County, signing a three-year deal with his hometown club.

International career
Camps won a call-up to the Northern Ireland under-18 squad in November 2012, having qualified for selection through his Northern Irish born grandmother.

Camps regularly represented the Northern Ireland Under-19 team and having represented the U18s and U19s, Camps was called up to represent the U20s in the Milk Cup finals.

Career statistics

References

External links

Northern Ireland profile at NIFG
Profile at the Rochdale A.F.C. website

1995 births
Living people
Footballers from Stockport
English footballers
Association football midfielders
Rochdale A.F.C. players
Fleetwood Town F.C. players
Stockport County F.C. players
English Football League players
English people of Northern Ireland descent
Northern Ireland youth international footballers
Northern Ireland under-21 international footballers